Fairfax Financial Holdings Limited is a Canadian financial holding company based in Toronto, Ontario, engaged in property, casualty, insurance and reinsurance, investment management, and insurance claims management. The company operates primarily through several subsidiaries, including Allied World, Odyssey Re, Northbridge Financial, Crum & Forster, Verassure Insurance, Onlia Agency Inc., and Zenith Insurance Company. The company was also the largest shareholder of Torstar with 40% of the Class B shares, as of May 2020. 

Fairfax is led by chairman and CEO Prem Watsa, who controls nearly half of the firm.

History

Market 
Fairfax was incorporated as Markel Service of Canada on March 13, 1951, and continued under the Canada Business Corporations Act in 1976. The name was subsequently changed to Markel Financial Holdings Ltd.

In 1984, Prem Watsa left GW Asset Management to found his own asset management firm, Hamblin Watsa Investment Counsel Ltd. together with his former boss from Confed, Tony Hamblin. Tony was the Chief Investment Officer at Confed. The five founding partners were: Tony Hamblin, Prem Watsa, Roger Lace, Brian Bradstreet and Frances Burke.

In 1985, Watsa took control of Markel Financial, a Canadian-based specialist in trucking insurance. The company was controlled by the Virginia-based Markel family.

Fairfax Financial Holdings Limited 
In May 1987, Watsa re-organized Markel Financial Holdings Limited and renamed it Fairfax Financial Holdings Limited (FAIRFAX: short for "fair, friendly acquisitions").

From 1985 to the end of 2010, the firm had a compound growth rate of approximately 25% in book value per share (per year), it is about 243 times what Fairfax began with in 1985.

Prem Watsa has served as chairman and chief executive officer of Fairfax Financial Holdings Limited since 1985 and as vice president of Hamblin Watsa Investment Counsel since 1985. Watsa, directly, and indirectly through 1109519 Ontario Limited, The Sixty Two Investment Company Limited and 810679 Ontario Ltd., owns the controlling equity voting interest of Fairfax Financial Holdings Limited ("Fairfax"). He owns roughly 10% of Fairfax, which accounts for 99% of his personal wealth. His 10-for-1 multiple voting shares give him just over 50% ownership.

Subprime mortgage bubble
As early as the 2003, in an annual report issued by the company, chief executive Prem Watsa raised concerns about securitized products and talks about the subprime mortgage crisis and the United States housing bubble.

In an interview in The Globe and Mail in 2007, Watsa said believed that the global credit squeeze is in its "early days", and indicated he believed there may be similarities to the Japanese asset price bubble.

The investment team of HWIC benefited from the subprime fallout, like John Paulson's New York-based Paulson & Co., Kyle Bass' Hayman Capital, Andrew Lahde's California-based Lahde Capital, Julian Robertson's "Tiger Cubs" (formerly known as "Tiger Management Corp."), and Michael Burry's Scion Capital (White Mountains Insurance Group is a minority investor in Scion Capital LLC), they have used derivatives to bet on the housing bubble. As of September 30, 2007, Fairfax and its subsidiaries owned an enormous credit default swap (CDS) book with a $18.5 billion notional amount and an average term to expiry of 4.2 years, on about 25 to 30 companies, the majority of which were bond insurers and mortgage lenders. The CDS book had a cost of $344 million, and a market value of $546 million. The market value of these swaps had fluctuated significantly in the 3rd quarter of 2007 from less than $200 million at the end of June, to $537 million at the end of July to almost $1 billion (twice that value) in August to $544 million at the end of September.

Recent years 
As of December 31, 2010, Fairfax had total assets of approximately $31.7 billion, and its revenue for the prior twelve months was approximately $6.2 billion. Since Watsa took over, the company book value per share has compounded by 23% per year, while the common stock price has followed the growth at 19% per year.

On September 23, 2013, Fairfax made an offer to purchase cell phone maker BlackBerry for $4.7 billion or $9.00 a share.  BlackBerry announced it had signed a letter of intent but would be open to other offers until November 4, 2013. Fairfax already held 10% of BlackBerry. The deal was later scrapped in favor of a US$1 billion cash injection which, according to one analyst, represented the level of confidence BlackBerry's largest shareholder had in the company.

In 2016, Fairfax offered seed funding to Kitchener startup, DOZR Inc. through their investment and innovation unit, Fair Ventures. Fair Ventures and Fairfax went on to support DOZR through multiple funding pitches, including the Colorado-based BaseCamp Equity Partners pitch in 2019. This pitch landed DOZR with $14 million CAD.

In 2017, Fairfax Financial Holdings increased its ownership of Torstar's non-voting shares from 20% to 40%. In late May 2020, Torstar accepted an offer of a sale of the company to NordStar Capital. The $52 million deal, supported by Fairfax, was expected to close by year end. 

On April 24, 2018, it was announced that Fairfax Financial Holdings Ltd. would acquire the Canadian division of Toys "R" Us for approximately $234 million with the intention to keep the 82 remaining stores in Canada open under the Toys "R" Us brand even after the chain's liquidation in the United States. The deal was completed on June 1, 2018. Fairfax sold Toys R Us Canada to businessman Doug Putman in 2021.

Fairfax Latin America Ltd. is a wholly-owned subsidiary of Fairfax. Based in Miami, Florida, it offers a wide range of general insurance products, including property, automobile and various specialty lines, through its subsidiaries located in Argentina, Chile, Colombia and Uruguay.
Fairfax Latin America has approximately 970 employees and, in 2021, generated annual gross premiums that exceeded US$727 million.
Fairfax Latin America underwrites through SBS Seguros Colombia S.A., Southbridge Insurance Company, Meridional Seguros and SBI Seguros Uruguay S.A.

Fairfax Financial has over 8,200 employees worldwide (5,000 of them in the United States). There are just 30 employees at head office in Toronto. 

On August 9, 2022, Fairfax Financial proposed a $954 million takeover bid for the Canadian restaurant operator Recipe Unlimited Corp.

Subsidiaries
 Brit plc an international insurance and reinsurance group, acquired by Fairfax in 2015
 Odyssey Re based in Stamford, Connecticut, underwrites treaty and facultative reinsurance as well as specialty insurance business (100%-owned by Fairfax).
 Northbridge Financial based in Toronto, provides property and casualty insurance through its Commonwealth, Federated, Lombard and Markel subsidiaries, primarily in the Canadian market as well as in selected U.S. and international markets (100%-owned—Fairfax completed the privatization of Northbridge on January 13, 2009).
 Fairfax Latin America Ltd.  Based in Miami, Florida, it offers a wide range of general insurance products, including property, automobile and various specialty lines.
 Crum & Forster based in Morristown, New Jersey, is a property and casualty insurance company.
 Zenith Insurance Company based in Woodland Hills, California, is a wholly owned subsidiary of Fairfax. Zenith is a specialist in workers' compensation insurance. Fairfax purchased 100% of Zenith National Insurance Corp for approximately $1.3 billion on May 20, 2010.
 Falcon Insurance, based in Hong Kong, writes property and casualty insurance.
 First Capital based in Singapore, writes property and casualty insurance.
 The U.S. runoff group, which consists of TIG, International Insurance and the Fairmont entities
 The European runoff group, which consists of RiverStone Insurance UK and Dublin, Ireland-based nSpire Re
 Hamblin Watsa Investment Counsel Ltd. HWIC was founded in 1984 and provides asset management for all of Fairfax's subsidiaries
 Cunningham Lindsey provides insurance claims services (43.6%-owned)
 MFXchange, established in 2002, provides technology services for Fairfax and the insurance industry.
 Group Re
 ICICI Lombard was a 26/74% joint venture with ICICI Bank Limited, India's second-largest bank and Fairfax Financial. In its IPO FAIRFAX sold its stake. 
 Pethealth Inc. based in Ontario, Canada, with offices in the UK and the US was acquired by Fairfax in November 2015.
 SBI Seguros Uruguay, based in Montevideo, was acquired by Fairfax on January 31, 2018
Toys "R" Us Canada, along with the Canadian trademark rights, was purchased from Toys "R" Us during the latter company's liquidation in 2018. Fairfax sold Toys “R” Us Canada to FYE owner Doug Putman in 2021.

Other investments
 Fairfax Asia, Fairfax Asia Limited ("Fairfax Asia") is the fastest growing insurance line of business within the Fairfax Group.
 Fairfax Brasil, Fairfax Brasil Seguros Corporativos S.A. ("Fairfax Brasil") is a Brazilian property and casualty insurance, headquartered in São Paulo.
 Polish Re, Polish Re (Polskie Towarzystwo Reasekuracji Spółka Akcyjna) based in Warsaw, Poland, writes reinsurance business in Central and Eastern Europe (100%-owned by Fairfax).
 Advent Capital (Holdings) PLC, Advent Capital, based in London, in the U.K., provides specialty property and casualty insurance, operating through Syndicates 780 and 3330 at Lloyd's London (100%-owned by Fairfax).
 Alliance Insurance, Fairfax owns a 20% stake in Alliance Insurance (Dubai).
 Alltrust Insurance Company of China, Fairfax owns a 15% stake in Alltrust Insurance Company in China.
 BlackBerry Ltd
 Digit general insurance Fairfax has backed up this startup in India
 Bengaluru International Airport Limited which operates the Kempegowda International Airport in Bengaluru, India. Fairfax owns 54% of BIAL with Siemens owning 20% while the rest is owned by the governments of India and Karnataka.
 Recipe Unlimited, a Canadian food services giant
 General Fidelity Insurance Company, On August 17, 2010, Fairfax purchased 100% of General Fidelity Insurance Company (GFIC – a runoff company), for approximately $241 million. GFIC will be under RiverStone, Fairfax runoff group.
 Gulf Insurance Co., On September 28, 2010, Fairfax purchased 41.3% of Gulf Insurance Co. (a Kuwait insurance company), for approximately $217 million.
 First Mercury Financial Corporation, On October 28, 2010, Fairfax announced to acquire all of the outstanding shares of First Mercury common stock for approximately $294 million. First Mercury will become the excess and surplus lines platform for Crum & Forster.
 The Pacific Insurance Berhad, Pacific Insurance is headquartered in Kuala Lumpur, Malaysia. On December 3, 2010, Fairfax announced to acquire Malaysian insurer, The Pacific Insurance Berhad, for approximately US$64 million. Pacific will join the Fairfax Asia group. (The deal is expected to close in the 1st Q. of 2011)
 Thomas Cook India, In May 2012 Fairfax invested in the company through Fairbridge Capital (Mauritius) Limited 
 Jordan Kuwait Bank, Odyssey Re, a wholly owned subsidiary of Fairfax owns a 4.8% stake of the Jordan Kuwait Bank.
 ICICI Lombard. ICICI Lombard is the largest private general insurance company in India, with a 12.5% market share. ICICI Bank, which owns the 74% of ICICI Lombard not owned by Fairfax, requested Indian government approval to sell a 5.9% stake in itself (ICICI Financial Services Ltd.) for $600 million to a group of private equity investors. ICICI Bank was looking at valuing ICICI Holdings at $10 billion. Goldman Sachs and other foreign funds were interested in buying the stake. Fairfax is carrying the minority interest in ICICI Lombard, on its balance sheet at $60 million, which appears to be a significant discount to intrinsic value (The 26% stake in ICICI Lombard is via Fairfax Asia, which is owned 100% by Fairfax Financial—which also includes a 29.5% economic interest owned by Odyssey Re Holdings Corp).
 Overstock.com. Fairfax holds a 16.5% stake in online retailer Overstock.com (Chou Associates Management Inc. holds a 9.9% stake). Patrick M. Byrne, the CEO, chairman and owner of Overstock comes from a family of value investors. He is the son of John J. Byrne, former chairman of Berkshire Hathaway's GEICO insurance subsidiary and White Mountains Insurance Group.
 Chou Associates Fund, In late 2002, Fairfax invested $50 million in Chou Associates Fund and another $50 million in the first half of 2003 (Fairfax apparently owns more than 26% of Chou Associates Fund).
AXA Insurance, AXA Group (France) completed a transaction of sale of its Ukrainian subsidiaries PJSC Insurance Company AXA Insurance and ALC Insurance Company AHA Life Insurance.
CSB Bank Ltd (formerly The Catholic Syrian Bank Limited), In 2018, Fairfax took a 51% stake in India based CSB Bank Ltd

Other notable transactions
 AbitibiBowater Inc. (new—scheduled to close on March 31, 2008) Fairfax made an investment of $350 million in AbitibiBowater convertible debentures with an 8% cash coupon. The debentures are convertible into common shares of AbitibiBowater Inc at US$10.00 per share. The debentures has an ability to pay interest in the form of additional "pay-in-kind" debentures at a rate of 10%, and has an AbitibiBowater subsidiary guarantee. They have a maturity of 5 years and are non-callable. Fairfax will have the right to appoint two directors to the Board of Directors.
 Toys 'R' Us Inc. which it sold in 2021 to Putnam.

References

External links
 

 
Financial services companies established in 1951
Insurance companies of Canada
Companies listed on the Toronto Stock Exchange
1951 establishments in Ontario
Canadian companies established in 1951
Companies based in Toronto